Charles Wilson Brown (30 April 1896 – 9 April 1956) was an Australian rules footballer who played for Collingwood in the Victorian Football League (VFL).

Brown played as a defender over eight seasons for Collingwood in the VFL. In his second season, Brown won a premiership with Collingwood in their Grand Final win over Fitzroy.

References

1896 births
1956 deaths
Collingwood Football Club players
Collingwood Football Club Premiership players
Balmain Australian Football Club players
Australian rules footballers from New South Wales
One-time VFL/AFL Premiership players
People from Carlton, Victoria
Australian rules footballers from Melbourne